Phil Jackson (born May 11, 1964) is an American former professional boxer, best known for challenging Lennox Lewis for the WBC Heavyweight Title in 1994.

Amateur career
Born in Miami Beach, Florida, Jackson was the heavyweight alternate on the 1988 United States Olympic team

Professional career

Known as "The Enforcer", Jackson began his career in 1988 on a tear, winning his first 25 fights mostly by KO, setting up a bout with hard-punching Canadian top contender Razor Ruddock in 1992.  Ruddock dominated, and Jackson was knocked down once in the 3rd, and once in the 4th, staying down for the 10 count.  He then won his next five fights to set up the fight in 1994 with Lewis.

Lewis received a lot of flak for the fight, given Jackson's loss to Ruddock who had lost to Lewis towards the end of his career. Jackson was Top 10 in the Ring Magazine at the time but boxing insiders remained sceptical. The fight was shown on HBO and was unimpressive, with Lewis plodding after Jackson en route to an 8th round TKO.

In 1995 his career began to sputter as he slipped to a journeyman. He lost bouts against future contenders Chris Byrd, Brian Nielsen, and Jeremy Williams.In 1998 he beat Alex Stewart, setting up a shot at a fringe belt in 1999 against Monte Barrett.  Barrett won easily, and Jackson went on to lose to a "who's who" list of heavyweight contenders, including Fres Oquendo, Wladimir Klitschko, Larry Donald, Derrick Jefferson, and Dominick Guinn. The loss to Guinn in 2004, a fight in which Guinn knocked Jackson out in twenty-three seconds, was Jackson's last bout.

He retired with a record with 44-13 with 38 knockouts.

Professional boxing record

|-
|align="center" colspan=8|44 Wins (38 knockouts, 6 decisions), 13 Losses (7 knockouts, 6 decisions), 1 No Contest 
|-
| align="center" style="border-style: none none solid solid; background: #e3e3e3"|Result
| align="center" style="border-style: none none solid solid; background: #e3e3e3"|Record
| align="center" style="border-style: none none solid solid; background: #e3e3e3"|Opponent
| align="center" style="border-style: none none solid solid; background: #e3e3e3"|Type
| align="center" style="border-style: none none solid solid; background: #e3e3e3"|Round
| align="center" style="border-style: none none solid solid; background: #e3e3e3"|Date
| align="center" style="border-style: none none solid solid; background: #e3e3e3"|Location
| align="center" style="border-style: none none solid solid; background: #e3e3e3"|Notes
|-align=center
|Loss
|
|align=left| Dominick Guinn
|KO
|1
|24/07/2004
|align=left| Atlantic City, New Jersey, U.S.
|align=left|
|-
|Win
|
|align=left| Garing Lane
|UD
|6
|24/10/2003
|align=left| Miami, Florida, U.S.
|align=left|
|-
|Loss
|
|align=left| Brian Nix
|UD
|6
|21/04/2002
|align=left| Laughlin, Nevada, U.S.
|align=left|
|-
|Loss
|
|align=left| Derrick Jefferson
|UD
|10
|16/02/2002
|align=left| Las Vegas, Nevada, U.S.
|align=left|
|-
|Win
|
|align=left| Nick Nurse
|UD
|6
|25/05/2001
|align=left| Miami, Florida, U.S.
|align=left|
|-
|Loss
|
|align=left| Larry Donald
|KO
|5
|25/05/2000
|align=left| Tunica, Mississippi, U.S.
|align=left|
|-
|Loss
|
|align=left| Wladimir Klitschko
|KO
|2
|12/11/1999
|align=left| Las Vegas, Nevada, U.S.
|align=left|
|-
|Loss
|
|align=left| Fres Oquendo
|UD
|10
|12/09/1999
|align=left| Kansas City, Missouri, U.S.
|align=left|
|-
|Loss
|
|align=left| Monte Barrett
|UD
|12
|03/04/1999
|align=left| Las Vegas, Nevada, U.S.
|align=left|
|-
|Win
|
|align=left| Ray Anis
|TKO
|2
|03/12/1998
|align=left| Bay Saint Louis, Mississippi, U.S.
|align=left|
|-
|Win
|
|align=left| Alex Stewart
|UD
|10
|24/07/1998
|align=left| Miami, Florida, U.S.
|align=left|
|-
|Win
|
|align=left| Gerard Jones
|TKO
|2
|29/05/1998
|align=left| Miami, Florida, U.S.
|align=left|
|-
|Win
|
|align=left| Bryant Smith
|TKO
|5
|27/03/1998
|align=left| Atlantic City, New Jersey, U.S.
|align=left|
|-
|Loss
|
|align=left| Keith McKnight
|UD
|10
|02/10/1997
|align=left| Nashville, Tennessee, U.S.
|align=left|
|-
|Loss
|
|align=left| Jeremy Williams
|KO
|1
|25/02/1997
|align=left| Long Beach, California, U.S.
|align=left|
|-
|Win
|
|align=left| Sonny Barch
|KO
|1
|02/11/1996
|align=left| Nassau, Bahamas
|align=left|
|-
|Win
|
|align=left| Harry Daniels
|TKO
|1
|24/08/1996
|align=left| Valdosta, Georgia, U.S.
|align=left|
|-
|Win
|
|align=left| Eddie Gonzales
|KO
|4
|29/07/1996
|align=left| Hallandale, Florida, U.S.
|align=left|
|-
|Win
|
|align=left| Jack Jackson
|TKO
|2
|15/06/1996
|align=left| Nassau, Bahamas
|align=left|
|-
|Loss
|
|align=left| Brian Nielsen
|TKO
|6
|29/03/1996
|align=left| Copenhagen, Denmark
|align=left|
|-
|Loss
|
|align=left| Chris Byrd
|UD
|12
|21/11/1995
|align=left| Auburn Hills, Michigan, U.S.
|align=left|
|-
|Win
|
|align=left| Larry Davis
|TKO
|2
|08/09/1995
|align=left| Miami Beach, Florida, U.S.
|align=left|
|-
|No Contest
|
|align=left| Alvin Ellis
|NC
|1
|22/08/1995
|align=left| Raleigh, North Carolina, U.S.
|align=left|
|-
|Win
|
|align=left| Krishna Wainwright
|TKO
|3
|22/07/1995
|align=left| Miami Beach, Florida, U.S.
|align=left|
|-
|Win
|
|align=left| Martin Foster
|TKO
|8
|01/11/1994
|align=left| Las Vegas, Nevada, U.S.
|align=left|
|-
|Win
|
|align=left| Art Card
|TKO
|4
|08/09/1994
|align=left| Davie, Florida, U.S.
|align=left|
|-
|Loss
|
|align=left| Lennox Lewis
|TKO
|8
|06/05/1994
|align=left| Atlantic City, New Jersey, U.S.
|align=left|
|-
|Win
|
|align=left| Eddie Gonzales
|UD
|10
|04/12/1993
|align=left| Corpus Christi, Texas, U.S.
|align=left|
|-
|Win
|
|align=left| Mike Dixon
|TKO
|5
|24/08/1993
|align=left| Atlantic City, New Jersey, U.S.
|align=left|
|-
|Win
|
|align=left| Lawrence Carter
|TKO
|3
|22/06/1993
|align=left| Atlantic City, New Jersey, U.S.
|align=left|
|-
|Win
|
|align=left| Terry Miller
|KO
|1
|24/04/1993
|align=left| Forest City, North Carolina, U.S.
|align=left|
|-
|Win
|
|align=left| Danny Wofford
|TKO
|4
|30/03/1993
|align=left| Kansas City, Missouri, U.S.
|align=left|
|-
|Loss
|
|align=left| Donovan Ruddock
|KO
|4
|26/06/1992
|align=left| Cleveland, Ohio, U.S.
|align=left|
|-
|Win
|
|align=left| Everett Mayo
|TKO
|3
|25/04/1992
|align=left| Miami Beach, Florida, U.S.
|align=left|
|-
|Win
|
|align=left| Frankie Hines
|KO
|1
|28/03/1992
|align=left| Forest City, North Carolina, U.S.
|align=left|
|-
|Win
|
|align=left| Melvin Epps
|TKO
|5
|13/12/1991
|align=left| Tampa, Florida, U.S.
|align=left|
|-
|Win
|
|align=left| Carl Williams
|TKO
|5
|14/09/1991
|align=left| Las Vegas, Nevada, U.S.
|align=left|
|-
|Win
|
|align=left| Tony Willis
|TKO
|5
|11/06/1991
|align=left| Miami Beach, Florida, U.S.
|align=left|
|-
|Win
|
|align=left| Lynwood Jones
|KO
|1
|23/05/1991
|align=left| Fort Lauderdale, Florida, U.S.
|align=left|
|-
|Win
|
|align=left| Jeff Sims
|TKO
|4
|07/04/1991
|align=left| Ocala, Florida, U.S.
|align=left|
|-
|Win
|
|align=left| William Morris
|TKO
|8
|19/02/1991
|align=left| Kansas City, Missouri, U.S.
|align=left|
|-
|Win
|
|align=left| Olian Alexander
|KO
|1
|14/12/1990
|align=left| Kansas City, Missouri, U.S.
|align=left|
|-
|Win
|
|align=left| Bobby Collins
|KO
|8
|28/08/1990
|align=left| Tampa, Florida, U.S.
|align=left|
|-
|Win
|
|align=left| Alvino Manson
|TKO
|2
|26/06/1990
|align=left| Tampa, Florida, U.S.
|align=left|
|-
|Win
|
|align=left| William Knorr
|KO
|1
|01/06/1990
|align=left| Fort Lauderdale, Florida, U.S.
|align=left|
|-
|Win
|
|align=left| David Nall
|TKO
|2
|18/04/1990
|align=left| Tampa, Florida, U.S.
|align=left|
|-
|Win
|
|align=left| Ricardo Spain
|KO
|3
|10/04/1990
|align=left| Miami, Florida, U.S.
|align=left|
|-
|Win
|
|align=left| Lino Cajina
|TKO
|2
|23/03/1990
|align=left| Homestead, Florida, U.S.
|align=left|
|-
|Win
|
|align=left| Gerald Brown
|KO
|1
|19/03/1990
|align=left| Miami Beach, Florida, U.S.
|align=left|
|-
|Win
|
|align=left| Jesse Shelby
|TKO
|5
|16/02/1990
|align=left| Miami, Florida, U.S.
|align=left|
|-
|Win
|
|align=left| Danny Wofford
|TKO
|5
|24/01/1990
|align=left| Hallandale, Florida, U.S.
|align=left|
|-
|Win
|
|align=left| David Robinson
|TKO
|1
|26/10/1989
|align=left| Kansas City, Missouri, U.S.
|align=left|
|-
|Win
|
|align=left| John Ford
|TKO
|1
|08/09/1989
|align=left| Hialeah, Florida, U.S.
|align=left|
|-
|Win
|
|align=left| Joe Adams
|TKO
|4
|03/07/1989
|align=left| Kansas City, Kansas, U.S.
|align=left|
|-
|Win
|
|align=left| Eddie Blackwell
|KO
|2
|22/04/1989
|align=left| Kansas City, Kansas, U.S.
|align=left|
|-
|Win
|
|align=left| Lionel Butler
|PTS
|4
|24/02/1989
|align=left| Biloxi, Mississippi, U.S.
|align=left|
|-
|Win
|
|align=left| Russell Watson
|TKO
|6
|04/02/1989
|align=left| Miami Beach, Florida, U.S.
|align=left|
|-
|Win
|
|align=left| Wendell Everett
|UD
|4
|09/12/1988
|align=left| Atlantic City, New Jersey, U.S.
|align=left|
|}

References

External links
 

Heavyweight boxers
1964 births
Living people
American male boxers